Veroljub "Verko" Stevanović (born 17 September 1946, Kragujevac, FPR Yugoslavia) is a Serbian politician who served as the mayor of Kragujevac from 1996 to 2000 and again from 2004 to 2014.

Biography
Stevanović graduated from the Faculty of Mechanical Engineering, University of Kragujevac in City of Kragujevac. His political career began in 1993, when he won his first seat in the Assembly of the Republic of Serbia, as a Member of the Serbian Renewal Movement. In 2006, he was Vice President of the Serbian Renewal Movement. In the interim Government of the Republic of Serbia 2000 he was co- minister of industry. In 1996, he became the first democratic Mayor of the City of Kragujevac.

In the first direct elections for mayor, held in 2004, he was re-elected Mayor for the City of Kragujevac.  He is one of the founders of the regional party, Together for Kragujevac in Kragujevac, which won the local elections in 2008. He was a member of the National Assembly of Serbia for the first time as member of Serbian Renewal Movement. After leaving SPO, he was elected to the National Assembly of Serbia several times on various lists: DSS–NS list (2007), For a European Serbia (2008), United Regions of Serbia (2012) and For Just Serbia (2016). Now, he is a councilor of City Assembly of Kragujevac, 
as a member of Healthy Serbia.

See also

 City of Kragujevac
 List of mayors of Kragujevac

References

External links
City of Kragujevac
Together for Kragujevac
Together for Šumadija

Gallery

1946 births
Living people
Eastern Orthodox Christians from Serbia
University of Kragujevac alumni
Mayors of Kragujevac
Members of the National Assembly (Serbia)
Together for Šumadija politicians
Healthy Serbia politicians